Liam Tuohy may refer to:
Liam Tuohy (actor), Irish actor
Liam Tuohy (footballer) (1933–2016), Irish footballer and manager